Cragin was a station on Metra's Milwaukee District/West Line. The station was located at 1912 N. LeClaire St. in the Belmont Cragin neighborhood of Chicago, Illinois. In Metra's zone-based fare system, Cragin was located in zone B. On December 11, 2006, Cragin and the nearby Hermosa station were closed and replaced by the Grand/Cicero station, which is located between both former stations. Cragin station was also used by commuter trains of the Milwaukee Road, the predecessor to Metra.

References

Cragin
Railway stations closed in 2006
Former Chicago, Milwaukee, St. Paul and Pacific Railroad stations